Pio (later Pio di Savoia), an ancient noble Italian family, was first mentioned by good authorities in the 14th century. After having long contended for the city of Modena with the House of Este, in 1336 they eventually agreed to renounce it, on condition that they retained the smaller domain of Carpi for themselves. They maintained control of Carpi for nearly 200 years and later acquired the minor fiefs of Sassuolo, Meldola, andSarsina, etc. Many members of the family were distinguished as condottieri, diplomats or ecclesiastics.

Alberto Pio (1418–1463) obtained from the house of Savoy in 1450 the privilege of adding "di Savoia" to his surname as a reward for his military services. Another Alberto Pio, who was Imperial and later French ambassador in Rome, won fame as a man of learning, but in 1525 he was stripped of the county of Carpi for "felony"  by Emperor  Charles V. Alberto's nephew, Cardinal Rodolfo Pio was a trusted adviser to Pius III and helped to establish the Inquisition at Milan. The main branch of the family died out in the early seventeenth century with the assassination in Venice of the cardinal's nephew, also called Rodolfo, after the latter had been forced in 1597 to sell the last family fiefdoms within the Papal States.

Another branch of the family renounced in 1499 the coregency over the lordship of Carpi in favour of Ercole I d'Este, Duke of Ferrara, and accepted in exchange the Este feud of Sassuolo. They held the domain of Sassuolo until 1599 when the feud was again illegitimately confiscated by the House of Este. Ascanio Pio (1587–1649), the heir to this branch of the family, was a dramatic poet of some merit. His son, Cardinal Carlo Pio purchased from the pope the title of prince of San Gregorio in order to increase the prestige of the family. Carlo's half-brother Giberto Pio (ca 1637–1676), who had inherited the principality, soon moved to Spain, where, through his marriage to Juana de Moura Corte Real y Moncada (mid 17th century–1717), he also acquired for the family the merely nominal marquis title of Castelo Rodrigo, and the effective one of the Dukedom of Nochera (referring to the locality of Nocera de' Pagani in the Kingdom of Naples at the time under Spain). In 1720, the title of Grandee was conferred upon his son Francesco Pio de Saboya y de Moura, erstwhile Governor of Madrid and Captain General of Catalonia. The Príncipe Pío hill and the Príncipe Pío multimodal train station in Madrid are named after them. Their descendants through the female line are to this day established in Spain.

A third branch of the family is still flourishing in Rome, the UK and the US.

References
 
G. Campori, Memorie storiche di Marco Pio di Savoia (Modena, 1876)
A. Ceriani and G. Porro, "Il Rotolo epistografo dei principi Pio di Savoia", in the Archivio storico lombardo, ser. II. an. XI. fasc. I; ser. III. an. VIII. 96, and ser. III. an. XIX. 453.

Italian noble families
History of Modena
Carpi, Emilia-Romagna